David Jones (born 3 July 1964) is an English retired footballer who played as a forward, striker and centre half. Throughout his career, he played for Chelsea, F.C.,  Doncaster Rovers and Hull City. He also briefly attended Pinner Sixth Form College Pinner County Grammar School.

Jones scored a hat-trick on his debut game playing for Doncaster Rovers. He retired from full-time soccer due to injury. He has also worked as a summariser on Radio Sheffield and as a camera man for Sky TV.

References

External links
David Jones career stats at the Post-War Players Database

1964 births
Living people
Footballers from Harrow, London
Association football forwards
Chelsea F.C. players
Doncaster Rovers F.C. players
Hull City A.F.C. players
Bury F.C. players
Leyton Orient F.C. players
Burnley F.C. players
English footballers